Frank Jack Dochnal (October 8, 1920 – July 7, 2010) was a race car driver from St. Louis, Missouri, United States.  He had some success in local racing in Missouri before making a single attempt to qualify for a Formula One Grand Prix at the age of 43, with a Cooper T51 in the 1963 Mexican Grand Prix.  Unfortunately, this bid failed after he crashed during unofficial practice.  At this point he retired from race driving and continued to work as a race mechanic. He later worked for Howard Hughes and as a technical official for USAC.

Complete Formula One results
(key)

References

External links
 Interview by Stephen Slater from F1 Rejects
 Biography at F1 Rejects

1920 births
2010 deaths
American Formula One drivers
Racing drivers from Missouri
Racing drivers from St. Louis
Sportspeople from St. Louis